Eugenie Meryl Sage (born 1958) is a New Zealand politician and environmentalist.

Political career

Local politics
Sage was a field officer and spokesperson for Forest and Bird before being elected as councillor for the Selwyn-Banks Peninsula Regional Constituency of Environment Canterbury at the 2007 local elections. She lost her seat when the Environment Canterbury Council were replaced by Commissioners on 1 May 2010.

In October 2010 she was appointed as a community member to the Selwyn-Waihora Zone Water Management Committee of Canterbury Water Management Strategy (CWMS).

Fifth National Government, 2011–2017
Sage contested the Selwyn electorate at the 2011 general election for the Green Party. Although she did not win the electorate, she was ranked at sixth on the party's list. The Green Party received sufficient votes to return 14 list members and Sage entered Parliament for the first time; she was re-elected as a list MP three years later after unsuccessfully contesting the Port Hills electorate. In addition to her caucus responsibilities as her party's spokesperson on Christchurch, conservation, environment, land information, local government, resource management issues, and water, Sage served as deputy chairperson of the local government and environment committee from 2011 to 2014 and as a member of that committee from 2014 to 2017.

Sixth Labour Government, 2017–present
She was re-elected to Parliament on the Green Party list.

Following the formation of the Sixth Labour Government, Sage assumed the ministerial portfolios for Conservation and Land Information, and Associate Minister for the Environment. In her two main positions, Sage was responsible for the two government agencies—the Department of Conservation and Land Information New Zealand—which managed more than one-third of New Zealand's land area. As Associate Minister for the Environment, Sage had responsibility for waste and oversaw the phase-out of single-use plastic bags in New Zealand.

As Conservation Minister, Sage led the development of Te Mana o te Taiao, the Aotearoa New Zealand Biodiversity Strategy, began a governance review of Fish & Game New Zealand, and initiated a controversial cull of imported Himalayan tahr on conservation land which resulted in her receiving death threats and was eventually scaled down. However, she failed to deliver a planned and funded drylands park in the Mackenzie Basin or a proposed prohibition on mining on conservation land. The latter was reportedly due to Government parties disagreeing on the policy.

As Land Information Minister, Sage had a decision-making role related to overseas ownership of New Zealand land. She was criticised by former Green MP Sue Bradford for approving "nearly every" application despite Green Party policy opposed to the practice of foreign land ownership; Sage said she did not have discretion under the law to decline many applications. Sage also attracted criticism for disagreeing with Labour ministers on some overseas investment decisions where joint decision-making was required; on one occasion after she had refused to agree to the expansion of a gold mine in Waihi a new application by the same company for the same land was referred to different ministers for a final decision. A review into the Overseas Investment Act was initiated in April 2019 but Labour's Associate Finance Minister David Parker was assigned responsibility for the review.

During the 2020 New Zealand election that was held on 17 October, Sage was re-elected to Parliament on the party list.  She also contested the Banks Peninsula electorate and came third place behind Labour's Tracey McLellan and National's Catherine Chu. She was not retained as a minister in the Government's second term and was instead appointed chairperson of Parliament's environment committee as part of the cooperation agreement between the Labour Party and the Green Party. She was also appointed the Green Party spokesperson for conservation, emergency management, the environment, forestry, land information, three waters and oceans and fisheries. On 9 November 2020, Sage was granted retention of the title "The Honourable" for life, in recognition of her term as a member of the Executive Council.

A member's bill in Sage's name was drawn from the ballot and introduced into Parliament in August 2022. The Crown Minerals (Prohibition of Mining) Amendment Bill would prevent new permits being granted on conservation land and prevent all coal-mining permits from being granted on any land from 2025. Four years prior, when Sage was Conservation Minister, the Government had indicated it would not grant new permits for mining on conservation land. Public consultation on the issue was intended to be carried out from September 2018; however, in early 2020 Sage acknowledged that it had not been possible for Labour, the Greens and New Zealand First to agree on a discussion document. The policy was not progressed before the 2020 election and was dropped when Labour was re-elected without requiring Green Party support. Sage's member's bill will be considered in 2023 but Labour signalled it will not support it.

In late November 2022, Sage convinced the Labour Party to support a Green Party amendment that the Water Services Bill set a 60% parliamentary threshold for privatising public water assets. This entrenchment clause was controversial and attracted criticism from the opposition National and ACT parties, and the New Zealand Law Society. In early December 2022, Leader of the House and Labour MP Chris Hipkins announced that the anti-privatisation entrenchment clause would be removed. Due to the removal of the anti-privatisation clause, Sage and her fellow Green MPs withdrew their support for the Water Services Entities Bill, which passed with the sole support of the Labour Party on 7 December 2022.

In late December 2022, Sage announced she would not be contesting the upcoming 2023 election.

Political views 
Sage has generally voted consistently with socially progressive positions. She voted in support of the Marriage (Definition of Marriage) Amendment Act 2013, End of Life Choice Act 2019, and Abortion Legislation Act 2020.

References

External links

Eugenie Sage at the Green Party of Aotearoa New Zealand
Profile at New Zealand Parliament website

1958 births
Living people
New Zealand environmentalists
People from Auckland
Women members of the New Zealand House of Representatives
Government ministers of New Zealand
Green Party of Aotearoa New Zealand MPs
New Zealand list MPs
Local politicians in New Zealand
Members of the New Zealand House of Representatives
21st-century New Zealand politicians
21st-century New Zealand women politicians
Candidates in the 2017 New Zealand general election
Women government ministers of New Zealand
Canterbury regional councillors
Candidates in the 2020 New Zealand general election